"Don't Call This Love" is a song by the Scottish singer Leon Jackson, released on 12 October 2008 on CD and as a digital download. The song is taken from his first album, Right Now, and is his second single release after his Christmas number one song "When You Believe" in 2007. The song also appears on the European pop singer Stefanie Heinzmann's first album, Masterplan.

"Don't Call this Love" gave Jackson his second UK Top 5 single on the UK Singles Charts, charting at number three in the United Kingdom and also charting within the Irish Singles Charts top ten. On the European Hot 100 charts, it charted at number ten, giving Jackson his second Europe top ten single. In Jackson's native country of Scotland, "Don't Call this Love" debuted at number one on the Scottish Singles Charts, remaining on the top position for two weeks. In total, "Don't Call this Love" spent twenty-two weeks in the Scottish Top 100 Singles charts and six weeks in the UK Top 100 Singles Charts.

Reception

"Don't Call this Love" received largely positive reviews from media critics following its release. Digital Spy commented "Don't Call this Love  is a thoroughly pleasant, classic-sounding ballad that anyone from Ronan Keating to Cliff Richard could carry off", further stating that "the luxuriant strings swell in all the right places, and Jackson's vocals are just are as smooth as they were on The X Factor, but there's a lack of character here that the glossy production can't quite disguise". Meanwhile, the BBC stated "there's really nothing going on here that isn't on your average James Morrison or Adele single, so the 'authentic music' brigade can shut up too. It's not all bad, it's not all good. He's not going to be around for a very long time, nor is he a national embarrassment".

Chart performance

In the United Kingdom, "Don't Call this Love" debuted inside the top five on the UK Singles Charts, charting at number three week beginning 25 November 2008, following several promotional appearances, including a "winner's comeback" performance on The X Factor. The following week, "Don't Call this Love" fell to number eleven on the UK charts, slipping out of the top ten entirely. It remained in the UK Top 40 for a following week, charting at number twenty, before slipping from the Top 40 to number forty-two, week commencing 15 November 2008. The following week, 22 November, "Don't Call this Love" charted at number seventy-nine before falling out of the UK Top 100 Singles Charts.

In Jackson's native Scotland, "Don't Call this Love" was considerablly more successful. The single topped the Scottish Singles Charts and remained at the number one position for two weeks, before slipping to number five on the charts and being knocked off the top spot by the X Factor's cover version of Mariah Carey's "Hero. In its following week, the song managed to remain within the Scottish Top 10 Singles, slipping to number eight and then to number ten the following week. On the chart update for the week commencing 23 November, "Don't Call this Love" had slipped from the Scottish Top 10 to its new position of number thirteen, falling three places from number ten in its previous week, with a new entry from Duffy with "Rain On Your Parade" knocking the song down to number thirteen. "Don't Call this Love" continued to fall down the charts in Scotland until its eighth week in the chart, where an increase in sales meant "Don't Call this Love" climbed from number twenty to number seventeen.

"Don't Call this Love" continued to climb the charts in Scotland over the Christmas period. In its ninth week within the Scottish Singles Charts, it climbed once again from its previous charting position of number seventeen to number eleven during the week 14–20 December 2008. The following week during Christmas, "Don't Call this Love" climbed back up the charts, this time charting inside the top ten once more, climbing up to number six from number eleven. It was the week's second biggest climb up the chart's, only behind "Once Upon a Christmas Song" by Geraldine McQueen. In the chart update of 27 December, "Don't Call this Love" had climbed once more to number three. Into the New Year, in the first week of the chart update in 2009, "Don't Call this Love" climbed once more, this time to number two on the Scottish charts, only behind Burke and her X Factor winner single in the charts. On 11 January "Don't Call this Love" slipped from the top ten, and even the top forty, from number two to number forty-nine. Moreover, during this week, Jackson's debut single "When You Believe" re-entered the Scottish Top Ten at number three. "Don't Call this Love" remained within the Scottish Top 100 Singles Charts for forty-one weeks, where its last charting position was number thirty.

In Ireland, "Don't Call this Love" debuted at number eight on the Irish Singles Charts, where it remained within the top 100 for a further five weeks. The song also debuted at number ten on the European Hot 100 Singles charts. On 10 January 2009 "Don't Call this Love re-entered the UK Singles Charts at number ninety-three.

Promotion and reception
On 11 October 2008 "Don't Call This Love" was put on the A-List at BBC Radio 2. Jackson appeared on The X Factor to perform the single, the day before it was released for download. He also performed it live on GMTV.

Music video
The music video shows Jackson walking around a street watching some girls and later singing on a stage in a bar. He hangs around with some girls, one main girl being his main love interest. He then sings about how she cannot deceive him any longer.

Cover versions

"Don't Call This Love" was covered by Swiss pop singer Stefanie Heinzmann, who recorded a studio version of the track on her debut album Masterplan which was released in March 2008.

Live performances
 The X Factor live show, Series 5, Episode 1 (2008)
 GMTV (2008)
 The Big Gig Live (2008)
 Hogmanay Live (2008)
 Right Now UK 2009 Tour (2009)

Track listing

Charts

Weekly charts

Year-end charts

References

2008 singles
Leon Jackson songs
Songs written by Chris Braide
Songs written by Carl Falk
Song recordings produced by Chris Braide
2008 songs
Syco Music singles
Songs written by Bryn Christopher
Number-one singles in Scotland

es:Don't Call This Love
sv:Leon Jackson